The highest-paid NBA players by season has recently eclipsed $40 million. Larry Bird was the first player to earn $5 million or more with a salary of $7,070,000 in the 1991-92 season. Magic Johnson became the first player to earn $10 million or more in the 94-95 season with a salary of $14,660,000. Patrick Ewing became the first player to earn $15 million or more in the 95-96 season with a salary of $18,724,000. Michael Jordan was the first NBA player to sign a contract worth over $20 million and in fact it exceeded $30 million as well in a season (1996-97) and (1997-98) where he earned $33,140,000; this was a record he had held for 20 years. Kobe Bryant became just the second player to reach $30 million when the 2013–14 season began. LeBron James became the third in the 2016–17 season. Stephen Curry became the first player to eclipse $40 million per year when he signed a record 5-year contract worth $201 million in 2017, starting with $34,682,550 in the 2017-18 season and ending with the largest earnings in the 2021-22 season with a record payout of $45,780,966, If his contract continues Curry is expected to be the first player to eclipse $50 million in the (2023-24) season.

Beginning in the 1984–85 NBA season, the NBA's first salary cap was introduced. The NBA salary cap is the maximum dollar amount each NBA team can spend on its players for the season. However, the NBA uses a "soft" salary cap, which means that significant "salary exceptions" allow NBA teams to exceed their allotted amount in order to sign players. The salary cap is determined during the offseason, but as stated earlier, it is liable to change.

An exception is necessary to sign a player for a contract that would exceed the salary cap threshold of the "soft cap". The Larry Bird exception, more commonly known as Bird Rights, allows teams to re-sign a current player only if he has played for that particular team for a minimum of three years. Another exception, known as the mid-level exception, allows for teams that are over the salary cap to sign one or more players as long as they do not exceed the total amount of the average NBA salary. Next, the bi-annual exception can be used by teams every other year to sign a free agent(s) for up to two years at an amount set by the NBA. Finally, the rookie player exception allows any NBA team to sign their first-round draft pick to a contract based upon a scale previously set forth by the NBA. Another option for teams would be to assign players to a league-assigned minimum salary contract for a maximum of two years.

According to 2010–11 NBA season game performance, the league's best players were not its highest-paid players. Each year there are ten players selected to one of the two All-NBA Teams. Out of those ten players chosen that year, Kobe Bryant was the only player that was also among the game's ten highest-paid during the 2010–11 NBA season.

Highest-paid player by season

Highest career earners

2020s

2022–2023

2021–2022

2020–2021

2019–2020

2010s

2018–2019

2017–2018

2016–2017

2015–2016

2014–2015

2013–2014

2012–2013

2011–2012

2010–2011

2009–2010

2000s

2008–2009

2007–2008

2006–2007

2005–2006

2004–2005

2003–2004

2002–2003

2001–2002

2000–2001

1999–2000

1990s

1998–1999

1997-1998

1996-1997

1995-1996

See also 

 List of highest paid Major League Baseball players
 List of player salaries in the NHL
 List of salaries

References

National Basketball Association lists
National Basketball Association statistical leaders
NBA highest-paid players by season
NBA highest-paid players by season
NBA players highest paid